QTM may refer to:

 QTM, a radiotelephony navigational Q code
 Quantity theory of money
 Quantum Turing machine
 quarter turn metric, a measurement used in puzzle cube analysis, see Optimal solutions for Rubik's Cube
 quaternary triangular mesh, a method to build a geodesic grid
 Quantum Corporation (NYSE stock ticker: QTM), see Companies listed on the New York Stock Exchange (Q)
 Quantum Air (IATA airline code: QO; ICAO airline code: QTM)